Karina Nadila Niab (born August 21, 1992) is an Indonesian actress, commercial model, television host, beauty-preneur and beauty pageant titleholder who was crowned Puteri Indonesia Pariwisata 2017 at the Puteri Indonesia 2017 beauty pageant, and represented Indonesia at the Miss Supranational 2017 pageant.

Personal life and education

Karina was born in Jakarta, Indonesia, on 21 August 1992 to an unknown father and a Minangkabaunese-Dutch mother, Jumaini Weissheimer. Her step-father, Lukius Niab, is a traditional Timorese. When at 17 Karina decided to become a beauty-preneur, model and make up content creator. Since then, She is work with several beauty brands and rose up her popularity. Until she approached by film producer to acting on several cinema films. she is also starting to be a TV presenter and co-hosting several TV shows.

Karina finishing her secondary study in Bakti Ibu Islamic Secondary School, 19 Junior High School and 82 Senior High School - Jakarta.
She holds a bachelor's degree on Business accounting from Indonesia Banking School, Jakarta, Indonesia. She is currently finishing her Master degree in Business management from PPM School of Management. On 19 December 2020, Karina married with Indonesian businessman, Rangga Prihartanto. The wedding event was held on Jakarta Convention Centre with a Minangkabau style.

Pageantry

Puteri Indonesia 2017 
Karina was crowned Puteri Indonesia East Nusa Tenggara 2017, by that she gain the rights to represent the province of East Nusa Tenggara at Puteri Indonesia 2017. During finals night on March 31, 2017, held in Jakarta Convention Center, Karina crowned as Puteri Indonesia Pariwisata, which gave her the title of Miss Supranational Indonesia 2017, she was crowned by her predecessor of Puteri Indonesia Pariwisata 2016 and Top 10 Miss Supranational 2016, Intan Aletrinö of West Sumatra. This is the very first time East Nusa Tenggara captured the Puteri Indonesia's crown.

Karina crowned together with Puteri Indonesia; Bunga Jelitha Ibrani of Jakarta Special Capital Region 5, Puteri Indonesia Lingkungan; Kevin Lilliana Junaedy of West Java, and Puteri Indonesia Perdamaian; Dea Goesti Rizkita Koswara of Central Java.

Miss Supranational 2017 
As Puteri Indonesia Pariwisata 2017, Karina represented Indonesia at the 9th edition of Miss Supranational 2017 held on 1 December 2017 at Hala MOSiR Arena in Krynica-Zdrój, Poland, where she ended up placing into Top 25 semifinalists, where she placed in the 14th ranked. This is the fourth time placements for Indonesia in Miss Supranational history and the third consecutive years of semifinalists placements since 2015 by Gresya Amanda Maaliwuga and 2016 by Intan Aletrinö.

The costume named "Lembuswana: The Apparatus of The King" was designed by Jember Fashion Carnaval.

Filmography 

Karina has appeared on several movies. She has acted in a television film and cinema box-office film. She is also taking part as the presenter for TV show.

Cinema films

Television films

Television shows

Advertisements 
 Samsung Galaxy Super Note-9
 KFC
 Wall's Cornetto Ice Cream
 Wall's Magnum Ice Cream
 Good Day Coffee
 Jawara Saus Sambal
 Wardah Cosmetics
 Rexona
 Biore Body Scrub

Awards and nomination

References

External links
 
 Profil di Indonesianfilmcenter.com
 
 
 
 Official Puteri Indonesia Website

Living people
1992 births
Indonesian female models
Miss Supranational contestants
Puteri Indonesia contestants
Puteri Indonesia winners
Indonesian beauty pageant winners
Indonesian Christians
Indonesian stage actresses
Indonesian film actresses
21st-century Indonesian actresses
Indonesian activists
Actresses from Jakarta
People from Kupang